= Cyperus pernambucensis =

Scientific classification
- Kingdom: Plantae
- Clade: Tracheophytes
- Clade: Angiosperms
- Clade: Monocots
- Clade: Commelinids
- Order: Poales
- Family: Cyperaceae
- Genus: Cyperus
- Species: C. pernambucensis

Binomial name
- Cyperus pernambucensis Steud.

Species of plant endemic to Brazil

Cyperus pernambucensis is a species of sedge that is endemic to north eastern Brazil.

The species was first formally described by the botanist Ernst Gottlieb von Steudel in 1854.

== See also ==
- List of Cyperus species
